Nakina Airport  is located adjacent to Nakina, Ontario, Canada.

Airlines and destinations

See also
 Nakina Water Aerodrome
 Nakina/Lower Twin Lake Water Aerodrome

References

Certified airports in Ontario
Transport in Thunder Bay District